Freemount may refer to:

 Freemount, County Cork, a village in County Cork, Ireland
 Freemount GAA, a Gaelic Athletic Association club based in Freemount village, County Cork, Ireland
 William Perkins House, also known as Freemount, a historic house in Alabama, United States

See also
 Fremont (disambiguation)